John Evans Johnson, D.D. was an Irish Anglican priest. 

Johnson was born in Dublin and educated at Trinity College, Dublin. He was appointed Archdeacon of  Ferns from 1848 to 1870.

Notes

Alumni of Trinity College Dublin
Irish Anglicans
Christian clergy from Dublin (city)
Archdeacons of Ferns
19th-century Irish clergy
Year of birth missing
Year of death missing